Glascote is an area of Tamworth, in the Tamworth district, in Staffordshire, England. The area centres on the Glascote Road, and is mainly residential with a few convenience stores and pubs.

History
Glascote is derived from the Old English word for glass and ‘cot’, meaning a hut. This suggests ‘a glass workshop’ since ‘cot’ is usually associated with some form of industrial process.

The manor of Glascote dates back to the 12th century. It was owned by the Longueville and Ferrers families, and eventually became part of the landholdings of Lord Townshend, in 1815. It was acquired by the Corporation of Tamworth in 1897 along with the Bolehall estate.

Sitting on the Glascote Road that runs from Tamworth town centre the village of Glascote is the oldest part containing mainly Victorian Terrace houses whilst much of Glascote located near the Marlborough Way dates from the post 1960s when the area grew rapidly and as a result much of the area has New Town style architecture.

Demographics
According to the 2001 census the population for Glascote is 8,344. White British is by far the largest population making up 97% of the population.

Governance
Glascote has its own ward within Tamworth Borough Council also named Glascote, The ward has 3 councillors who are Chris Cooke (UKIP), Garry Hirons (Labour) and Simon Peaple (Labour). Tamworth Borough Council which Glascote is part of is entirely unparished.

Glascote is part of the Tamworth - Bolebridge Ward in Staffordshire County Council and is represented by the Conservative Michael Oates and Chris Cooke (Independent)

Glascote is part of the Tamworth Parliamentary Constituency and it is currently represented by the Conservative Christopher Pincher who has held the seat since the 2010 general election.

Civil parish 
Bolehall and Glascote was formerly a township in the parish of Tamworth, from 1896 Bolehall and Glascote was a civil parish in its own right, on 13 November 1957 the parish was renamed to "Glascote", on 1 April 1965 the parish was abolished and merged with Tamworth. In 1961 the parish had a population of 2538.

Religion
According to the 2001 census 72% of the population described their religion as Christian, 20% did not have a religion and 7% refused to state their religion with other faiths making up less than 0.01% of the population with just 49 adherents.

Glascote is part of the Anglican Diocese of Lichfield.

Transport
The A5 runs through Glascote as part of the £26,000,000  Fazeley, Two Gates and Wilnecote Bypass which opened in July 1995, acting as a bypass of the old Watling Street which runs through Wilnecote.

Glascote is equidistant from Tamworth railway station in Tamworth town centre and Wilnecote railway station in Wilnecote.

Wilnecote railway station is barely served in comparison to Tamworth Railway station.

The nearest airport is Birmingham Airport.

The buses that serve the area are: 4,7,7A,7E,16A.

Media
The local paper for Glascote is the Tamworth Herald.

THE Tamworth Trader was a local paper that was a free paper for advertising and lonely hearts.

The local commercial radio station for Glascote is Touch Radio Burton, Lichfield and Tamworth which is broadcast from Tamworth town centre. The BBC Local Radio is BBC WM Broadcast from Birmingham.

See also
Listed buildings in Tamworth, Staffordshire

References

Areas of Tamworth, Staffordshire
Former civil parishes in Staffordshire